The Christian Troubadours, also known as Christian Troubadours, were an American Southern gospel quartet, performing from the mid-1950s through the mid-1970s.

History
The Christian Troubadours were originally organized in Lakewood, California, by guitar player and bass singer Wayne Walters, a native of Belleville, Arkansas. After the Troubadours formed, Walters also became manager and songwriter for the group. In 1962, upright bass player and tenor singer Bill Carter traveled to California from Eagleton, Arkansas, to join the Troubadours.  At this time, the group had relocated in Modesto, California.  A year later, Phil Price joined the band to play banjo as well as sing baritone and as a musical arranger.  In time, Leroy Blankenship became lead singer in addition to preaching at the revival meetings and services held in conjunction with concerts given by the group.  Following the addition of Blankenship to the Troubadours, the group relocated to Nashville, Tennessee. Frank Petty of Weed, California, played the violin and one of the earliest members played mandolin; his name was Harvey Yeoman. Larry King also played bass and sang with the group for a short time.

Discography
Country Gospel Singing (Sundown Records, master tape at Sun Records Memphis, TN)
Labor of Love (Vision Records)
Time For Prayer
Country Gospel Singing Volume 2
Love Thy Neighbor
The Inner Glow
Gospel In Bluegrass
I've Got A Song
This Is Gospel Country (Scripture Records)
Down Home Gospel (Scripture Records)
Far East Tour (Hymntone Records)
Authentic Country Gospel (Hymntone Records)
Filled With Praise (Heart Warming Records)
The Nashville Sound
Extra, Tell The News
Something For Everybody
Down To Earth (Heritage Records)
Versatility (Heritage Records)
On The Right Track (Jessup Records)
Now... Hear This! (Heritage Records)

Southern gospel performers
Musical groups from California
Musical groups from Tennessee
1954 establishments in California